Modbus is a data communications protocol originally published by Modicon (now Schneider Electric) in 1979 for use with its programmable logic controllers (PLCs). Modbus has become a de facto standard communication protocol and is now a commonly available means of connecting industrial electronic devices.

Modbus is popular in industrial environments because it is openly published and royalty-free. It was developed for industrial applications, is relatively easy to deploy and maintain compared to other standards, and places few restrictions on the format of the data to be transmitted.

The Modbus protocol uses character serial communication lines, Ethernet, or the Internet protocol suite as a transport layer. Modbus supports communication to and from multiple devices connected to the same cable or Ethernet network. For example, there can be a device that measures temperature and another device to measure humidity connected to the same cable, both communicating measurements to the same computer, via Modbus.

Modbus is often used to connect a plant/system supervisory computer with a remote terminal unit (RTU) in supervisory control and data acquisition (SCADA) systems. Many of the data types are named from industrial control of factory devices, such as ladder logic because of its use in driving relays: a single-bit physical output is called a coil, and a single-bit physical input is called a discrete input or a contact.

The development and update of Modbus protocols have been managed by the Modbus Organization since April 2004, when Schneider Electric transferred rights to that organization. The Modbus Organization is an association of users and suppliers of Modbus-compliant devices that advocates for the continued use of the technology. Modbus Organization, Inc. is a trade association for the promotion and development of the Modbus protocol.

Limitations
 Since Modbus was designed in the late 1970s to communicate to programmable logic controllers, the number of data types is limited to those understood by PLCs at the time. Large binary objects are not supported.
 No standard way exists for a node to find the description of a data object, for example, to learn that a register value represents a temperature between 30 and 175 degrees.
 Since Modbus is a client/server (formerly master/slave) protocol, there is no way for a field device to get data by the event handler mechanism (except over Ethernet TCP/IP, called open-mbus) as the client node must routinely poll each field device and look for changes in the data. This consumes bandwidth and network time in applications where bandwidth may be expensive, such as over a low-bit-rate radio link.
 Modbus is restricted to addressing 247 devices on one data link, which limits the number of field devices that may be connected to a parent station (again, Ethernet TCP/IP is an exception).
 Modbus protocol itself provides no security against unauthorized commands or interception of data.

Modbus object types
The following object types may be provided by a Modbus server to a Modbus client device: The addresses are representative of the original
Modicon specification. Under the current standard the address can be 0 - 65535 with the object type identified by the command used
to read or write the coil or register.

Protocol versions
Versions of the Modbus protocol exist for serial ports, and for Ethernet and other protocols that support the Internet protocol suite. There are many variants of Modbus protocols:
 Modbus RTU (Remote Terminal Unit) – used in serial communication, and is the most common implementation available for Modbus. Modbus RTU makes use of a compact, binary representation of the data for protocol communication. The RTU format follows the commands/data with a cyclic redundancy check checksum as an error check mechanism to ensure the reliability of data. A Modbus RTU message must be transmitted continuously without inter-character hesitations. Modbus messages are framed (separated) by idle (silent) periods.
 Modbus ASCII – used in serial communication and makes use of ASCII characters for protocol communication. The ASCII format uses a longitudinal redundancy check checksum. Modbus ASCII messages are framed by a leading colon (":") and trailing newline (CR/LF).
 Modbus TCP/IP or Modbus TCP – a Modbus variant used for communications over TCP/IP networks, connecting over port 502. It does not require a checksum calculation, as lower layers already provide checksum protection.
 Modbus over TCP/IP, Modbus over TCP, or Modbus RTU/IP – a variant that differs from Modbus TCP in that a checksum is included in the payload, as with Modbus RTU.
 Modbus over UDP – some have experimented with using Modbus over UDP on IP networks, which removes the overhead of TCP.
 Modbus Plus (Modbus+, MB+, or MBP) – Modbus Plus is proprietary to Schneider Electric and unlike the other variants, it supports peer-to-peer communications between multiple clients. It requires a dedicated co-processor to handle fast HDLC-like token rotation. It uses twisted pair at 1 Mbit/s and includes transformer isolation at each node, which makes it transition/edge-triggered instead of voltage/level-triggered. Special hardware is required to connect Modbus Plus to a computer, typically a card made for the ISA, PCI, or PCMCIA bus.
 Pemex Modbus – an extension of standard Modbus with support for historical and flow data. It was designed for the Pemex oil and gas company for use in process control and never gained widespread adoption.
 Enron Modbus – another extension of standard Modbus developed by Enron with support for 32-bit integer and floating-point variables, and historical and flow data. Data types are mapped using standard addresses. The historical data serves to meet an American Petroleum Institute (API) industry standard for how data should be stored.

Data models and function calls are identical for the first four variants listed above; only the encapsulation is different. However the variants are not interoperable, nor are the frame formats.

Communications and devices
Each device communicating (i.e., transferring data) on a Modbus is given a unique address.

In Modbus RTU, Modbus ASCII, and Modbus Plus (which are all RS-485 single-cable multi-drop networks), only the node assigned as the 'master' may initiate a command. All other devices are 'slaves' which respond to requests and commands.

Nomenclature is different for the protocols using Ethernet, such as Modbus TCP. Here any device can send out a Modbus command, and as is usual in computer networks, the device sending the command is the 'client' and the response comes from a 'server'.

Many modems and gateways support Modbus, as it is a simple and often-copied protocol. Some of them were specifically designed for this protocol. Different implementations use wireline or wireless communication, such as in the ISM radio band, and even Short Message Service (SMS) or General Packet Radio Service (GPRS).

Commands
Modbus commands can instruct a Modbus device to:

 change the value in one of its registers, that is written to Coil and Holding registers
 read an I/O port: read data from a Discrete Input or from a Coil
 command the device to send back one or more values contained in its Coil and Holding registers

A Modbus command contains the Modbus address of the device it is intended for (1 to 247). Only the addressed device will respond and act on the command, even though other devices might receive it (an exception is specific broadcastable commands sent to node 0, which are acted on but not acknowledged).

All Modbus commands contain checksum information to allow the recipient to detect transmission errors.

Frame formats
A Modbus "frame" consists of an Application Data Unit (ADU), which encapsulates a Protocol Data Unit (PDU):
 ADU = Address + PDU + Error check.
 PDU = Function code + Data.

In Modbus data frames, the most significant byte of a multi-byte value is sent before the others.

All Modbus variants use one of the following frame formats.

Modbus RTU frame format
This format is primarily used on asynchronous serial data lines like RS-485/EIA-485. Its name refers to a remote terminal unit.

CRC calculation:
 Polynomial: x16 + x15 + x2 + 1 (CRC-16-ANSI also known as CRC-16-IBM, normal hexadecimal algebraic polynomial being 8005 and reversed A001).
 Initial value: 65,535.
 Example of frame in hexadecimal: 01 04 02 FF FF B8 80 (CRC-16-ANSI calculation for the 5 bytes from 01 to FF gives 80B8, which is transmitted least significant byte first).

Modbus ASCII frame format
Primarily used on 7-bit or 8-bit asynchronous serial lines.

Address, Function, Data, and LRC are ASCII hexadecimal encoded values, whereby 8-bit values (0–255) are encoded as two human-readable ASCII characters from the ranges 0–9 and A–F. For example, a value of 122 (7A16) is encoded as two ASCII characters, "7" and "A", and transmitted as two bytes, 55 (3716, ASCII value for "7") and 65 (4116, ASCII value for "A").

LRC is calculated as the sum of 8-bit values (excluding the start and end characters), negated (two's complement) and encoded as an 8-bit value. For example, if Address, Function, and Data are 247, 3, 19, 137, 0, and 10, the two's complement of their sum (416) is −416; this trimmed to 8 bits is 96 (256 × 2 − 416 = 6016), giving the following 17 ASCII character frame: :F7031389000A60␍␊. LRC is specified for use only as a checksum: because it is calculated on the encoded data rather than the transmitted characters, its 'longitudinal' characteristic is not available for use with parity bits to locate single-bit errors.

Modbus TCP frame format
Primarily used on Ethernet networks.

Unit identifier is used with Modbus/TCP devices that are composites of several Modbus devices, e.g. Modbus/TCP to Modbus RTU gateways. In such a case, the unit identifier is the Server Address of the device behind the gateway. Natively Modbus/TCP-capable devices usually ignore the Unit Identifier.

Functions and commands
Prominent conceptual entities in a Modbus server include the following:
 Coils: readable and writeable, 1 bit (off/on)
 Discrete Inputs: read-only, 1 bit (off/on)
 Input Registers: read-only measurements and statuses, 16 bits (0–65,535)
 Holding Registers: readable and writeable configuration values, 16 bits (0–65,535)

The commands to read and write these entities are summarized in the following table. The most primitive reads and writes are shown in bold.

Some sources use terminology that differs from the standard; for example Force Single Coil instead of Write Single Coil.

There are three categories of Modbus function codes: public, user-defined and reserved.

Format of requests and responses
Requests and responses follow the frame formats described above. This section gives details of the data formats of the most often used function codes.

Function codes 1 (read coils) and 2 (read discrete inputs)
Request:
Address of first coil/discrete input to read (16-bit)
Number of coils/discrete inputs to read (16-bit)

Normal response:
Number of bytes of coil/discrete input values to follow (8-bit)
Coil/discrete input values (8 coils/discrete inputs per byte)

Value of each coil/discrete input is binary (0 for off, 1 for on). First requested coil/discrete input is stored as least significant bit of first byte in reply. If number of coils/discrete inputs is not a multiple of 8, most significant bit(s) of last byte will be stuffed with zeros.

For example, if eleven coils are requested, two bytes of values are needed. Suppose states of those successive coils are on, off, on, off, off, on, on, on, off, on, on, then the response will be 02 E5 06 in hexadecimal.

Because the byte count returned in the reply message is only 8 bits wide and the protocol overhead is 5 bytes, a maximum of 2008 (251 x 8) discrete inputs or coils can be read at once.

Function code 5 (force/write single coil)
Request:
Address of coil (16-bit)
Value to force/write: 0 for off and 65,280 (FF00 in hexadecimal) for on
Normal response: same as request.

Function code 15 (force/write multiple coils)
Request:
Address of first coil to force/write (16-bit)
Number of coils to force/write (16-bit)
Number of bytes of coil values to follow (8-bit)
Coil values (8 coil values per byte)
The value of each coil is binary (0 for off, 1 for on). The first requested coil is stored as the least significant bit of the first byte in the request. If a number of coils is not a multiple of 8, the most significant bit(s) of the last byte should be stuffed with zeros. See example for function codes 1 and 2.

Normal response:
Address of first coil (16-bit)
Number of coils (16-bit)

Function codes 4 (read input registers) and 3 (read holding registers)
Request:
Address of first register to read (16-bit)
Number of registers to read (16-bit)
Normal response:
Number of bytes of register values to follow (8-bit)
Register values (16 bits per register)
Because the maximum length of a Modbus PDU is 253 (inferred from the maximum Modbus ADU length of 256 on RS485), up to 125 registers can be requested at once when using the RTU format, and up to 123 over TCP.

Function code 6 (preset/write single holding register)
Request:
Address of holding register to preset/write (16-bit)
New value of the holding register (16-bit)
Normal response: same as request.

Function code 16 (preset/write multiple holding registers)
Request:
Address of first holding register to preset/write (16-bit)
Number of holding registers to preset/write (16-bit)
Number of bytes of register values to follow (8-bit)
New values of holding registers (16 bits per register)
Because the maximum length of a Modbus PDU is 253 (inferred from the maximum Modbus ADU length of 256 on RS485), up to 123 registers can be written at once.

Normal response:
Address of first preset/written holding register (16-bit)
Number of preset/written holding registers (16-bit)

Exception responses
For a normal response, the server repeats the function code. Should a server want to report an error, it will reply with the requested function code plus 128 (hex 0x80) (3 becomes 131 = hex 0x83), and will only include one byte of data, known as the exception code.

Main Modbus exception codes

Entity numbers and addresses
The Modbus Organization mentions the following in the Modbus Application Protocol v1.1b:

 The Modbus application protocol defines the PDU addressing rules: In a PDU, each data item is addressed from 0 to 65535.
 It also defines a MODBUS data model composed of four blocks that comprise several elements numbered from 1 to n.
 In the Modbus data model, each element within a data block is numbered from 1 to n.

Some conventions govern how Modbus entities (coils, discrete inputs, input registers, holding registers) are referenced.

It is important to make a distinction between entity number and entity address:
 Entity numbers combine entity type and entity location within their description table
 Entity address is the starting address, a 16-bit value in the data part of the Modbus frame, ranging from 0 to 65,535 (0000 to FFFF in the packets)

In the traditional convention, entity numbers start with a digit representing the entity type, followed by four digits representing the entity location:
 coils numbers start with 0 and span from 00001 to 09999,
 discrete input numbers start with 1 and span from 10001 to 19999,
 holding register numbers start with 4 and span from 40001 to 49999.
For data communications, the entity location (1 to 9,999) is translated into a 0-based entity address (0 to 9,998) by subtracting 1. For example, in order to read holding registers starting at number 40001, the data frame will contain function code 3 (as seen above) and address 0. For holding registers starting at number 40100, the address will be 99.

This limits the number of addresses to 9,999 for each entity. A de facto standard extends this to 65,536 by adding one digit to the previous list:
 coil numbers span from 000001 to 065536,
 discrete input numbers span from 100001 to 165536,
 input register numbers span from 300001 to 365536,
 holding register numbers span from 400001 to 465536.
When using extended referencing, all number references must have exactly 6 digits to avoid confusion between coils and other entities. For example, to distinguish between holding register #40001 and coil #40001, if coil #40001 is the target, it must appear as #040001.

Another way to note the data addresses is to use the hexadecimal value, which clarifies the use of the four digits in the traditional convention mentioned previously.
 coil numbers span from 0x0000 to 0xFFFF
 discrete input numbers span from 1x0000 to 1xFFFF
 input register numbers span from 3x0000 to 3xFFFF
 holding register numbers span from 4x0000 to 4xFFFF
The advantage of this notation is that the same numbers are found when decoding Modbus packets.

JBUS mapping
Another de facto protocol closely related to Modbus appeared later, and was defined by PLC maker April Automates, the result of a collaborative effort between French companies Renault Automation and Merlin Gerin et Cie in 1985: JBUS. Differences between Modbus and JBUS at that time (number of entities, server stations) are now irrelevant as this protocol almost disappeared with the April PLC series, which AEG Schneider Automation bought in 1994 and then made obsolete. However, the name JBUS has survived to some extent.

JBUS supports function codes 1, 2, 3, 4, 5, 6, 15, and 16 and thus all the entities described above, although numbering is different:
 Number and address coincide: entity #x has address x in the data frame.
 Consequently, entity number does not include the entity type. For example, holding register #40010 in Modbus will be holding register #9, at address 9 in JBUS.
 Number 0 (and thus address 0) is not supported. The server should not implement any real data at this number and address, and it can return a null value or throw an error when requested.

Implementations
Almost every implementation has variations from the official standard. Different varieties might not communicate correctly between equipment of different suppliers. Some of the most common variations are:
 Data types
 IEEE 754 floating-point number
 32-bit integer
 8-bit data
 Mixed data types
 Bit fields in integers
 Multipliers to change data to/from integer. 10, 100, 1000, 256, ...
 Protocol extensions
 16-bit server addresses
 32-bit data size (1 address = 32 bits of data returned)
 Word-swapped data

Modbus Plus
Despite the name, Modbus Plus is not a variant of Modbus. It is a different protocol, involving token passing. It is a proprietary specification of Schneider Electric, though it is unpublished rather than patented. It is normally implemented using a custom chipset available only to partners of Schneider.

See also
 CAN bus

References

External links
Specifications
 Modbus Organization – links to protocol specifications
 Modbus over serial line V1.0 – Modbus Organization (2002)
 Modicon Modbus Protocol Reference Guide – Modbus Organization (1996). This is an obsolete Modbus specification, should only be used to address legacy issues.

Other
 Modbus for Field Technicians at modbusbacnet.com
 Modbus tutorial at RF Wireless World

Building automation
Industrial computing
Industrial Ethernet
Network protocols